Active from 1951 to 1975, Air Viet Nam (Air VN) was South Vietnam's first commercial air carrier, headquartered in District 1, Saigon. Established under a decree by Chief of State Bảo Đại, the airline flew over two million passengers, throughout the Vietnam War, and until its collapse due to Fall of Saigon.

History 

Air Viet Nam's initial fleet consisted of five Cessna 170s, Douglas DC-3s and Douglas DC-4s with the airline flying mainly between cities and towns throughout Vietnam. By 1975, Air Viet Nam was using a fleet of Boeing aircraft, some leased from Pan Am and China Airlines consisting of a number of Boeing 707s and Boeing 727s on both regional and international routes.

As passenger traffic increased with the start of the Vietnam War, Air Viet Nam added aircraft, initially Viscounts, DC-3s, and DC-4s. It eventually obtained more modern aircraft, including Boeing 727s, some of which were obtained from Air France and Pan Am. At least one C-46 was leased from China Airlines, and was flown by a Taiwanese crew. That aircraft had a color scheme different from the rest of the Air Viet Nam fleet.

In an unusual joint venture, Air Viet Nam was joined by Continental Air Services (CASI), a subsidiary airline of Continental Airlines set up to provide operations and airlift support in Southeast Asia, in the mid-1960s. Under this agreement, CASI would share passengers and cargo routes with Air Viet Nam on certain domestic and international routes. In addition, CASI and Air Viet Nam would share hangars and flight lines.  CASI also picked up a portion of aircraft maintenance. Heavy engine overhaul was done in Hong Kong, by China Airlines, and some in Taiwan, by Air Asia (a subsidiary of Air America). CASI paid a portion of its revenues to Air Viet Nam for the routes and privileges. Many CASI aircraft operating from Saigon carried the dragon/flag roundel of Air Viet Nam.

In 1972, Air Vietnam had one B747-200 leased from Air France and another B747-100 leased from Pan Am both of which were flown back to their owners within a few weeks of the Fall of Saigon.

Fall of Saigon 
During the Fall of Saigon and the impending invasion of North Vietnam into South Vietnam, Air Viet Nam decided to assist and help all South Vietnamese citizens to escape to neighboring countries. Many of their pilots and crew worked long hours ferrying South Vietnamese citizens to Thailand, Taiwan, the Philippines, and other Southeast Asian countries to escape the invading North Vietnamese army. One Boeing 707 flew to Taipei for the use of former President Nguyen Van Thieu and his wife, and close aides had been flown into exile on a CIA C-118 transport. Thieu was extended the courtesy once in exile of the Boeing jet as he went from first Taiwan, then the United Kingdom, before finally flying onto the United States of America where it was returned to Pan Am from which it had been leased. An Air Vietnam aircraft abandoned at the Songshan Airport was later handed over to a Taiwanese airline.

One Air Vietnam Boeing 727 was returned to Vietnam from Hong Kong in early June 1975, by lead pilot Huynh Minh Boong, who had married General Pham Hung's sister. Captain Huynh Minh Boong with over 10,000 flight hours, was a pilot on Vietnam Airlines overseas flights due to his IATA credentials, then in early 1980 he was appointed as head of training of Vietnam Airlines, now retired and lives in Ho Chi Minh City.

The only commercial jet airplanes transferred from Air Vietnam to Vietnam Airlines are: one  Boeing 707 and one Boeing 727-100.

Destinations

Codeshare partners
According to the timetable published in 1969, Air Vietnam codeshared with the following airlines:

 QANTAS
 Royal Air Cambodge
 Air France
 Union de Transports Aériens
 Air India
 Japan Air Lines
 Cathay Pacific
 KLM Royal Dutch Airlines
 China Air Lines
 Pan American World Airways
 Northwest Orient Airlines
 British Overseas Airways Corporation

Flight crew
Air Viet Nam flight crews were composed of civilians with a mixture of ex-military pilots, (mostly former Republic of Vietnam Air Force), along with a few Americans. However, one American CASI pilot reported that the Taiwanese crew of the leased C-46 always parked its aircraft separately at Tân Sơn Nhứt International Airport in Saigon and kept its distance from the regular Air Viet Nam and CASI crews.

Uniforms
Pilots for Air Viet Nam wore a distinctive gold/bronze wing with a center shield containing a colored enamel version of the dragon/flag. It can be presumed that some senior grades of pilot and crew existed, although how these were indicated is not clear.

Stewardesses, or flight attendants, wore a gold or bronze metal wing with embossed/relief dragon/flag roundel. Uniforms consisted of the traditional Áo dài in a variety of colors.

Aircraft livery
Air Vietnam aircraft generally had a single or dual green stripe down the main fuselage. The top fuselage was generally white with a natural metal (silver) lower. The colorful dragon/flag roundel appeared in various sizes, most often on the tail rudder. Sometimes the roundel would appear alone and occasionally with a dual green stripe. The wording "Air Viet Nam" appeared in red/orange lettering above the windows on all large aircraft except the 727s, which were marked "Hàng Không Việt Nam". Exceptions to these schemes included the early Viscount aircraft, which were all white with a green stripe and had the roundel appearing on the front fuselage. The Chinese C-46 aircraft had a blue and red nose-side stripe with the roundel appearing on the rudder.

Marketing
Advertisements used from the mid-1960s included South Vietnamese Olympians, such as Thach Thi Ngoc, and flamboyant military officer Nguyễn Cao Kỳ, whose wife Madame Nguyễn Cao Kỳ was a flight stewardess before they were married. These celebrities promoted the airline's operation of Viscounts on the "Green Dragon Route", alternating flights from Saigon to Siem Reap, Cambodia; Bangkok, Thailand; and Hong Kong. Timetables indicate domestic routes covering destinations as far north as Huế, as far south as Cà Mau, and including almost every major city in between.

Incidents and accidents
16 August 1954 Bristol Freighter 21E F-VNAI crashed on the bank of the Sedone River (a tributary of the Mekong River) while on approach to Pakse for an emergency landing following engine failure, killing 47 of 55 on board. The aircraft was flying Red River refugees from Hanoi to Saigon.

The aircraft was operating on a flight route from Phu Bai Airport to Da Nang Airport.

1962 Douglas C-54B XV-NUA was reportedly written off at an unknown location.

2 April 1969 Douglas DC-6B XV-NUC was destroyed on the ground at Hue-Citadel Airfield during a Communist attack.

1 May 1969 Douglas C-54B F-BELL burned out on the ground while parked at Saigon Airport.

20 September 1969 Douglas C-54D XV-NUG collided with US Air Force McDonnell Douglas F-4 Phantom II 67-0393 and crashed into a field near Da Nang, killing 74 of 75 on board and two people working in the field; the Phantom was able to land safely. The C-54 was operating on a flight route from Saigon to Pleiku Airport to Da Nang Airport. When the pilot of the Phantom was cleared to land on Runway 17R by ATC, the pilot of the C-54, cleared to land on Runway 17L, thought that the message was addressed to his aircraft and turned right for approach to Runway 17R. This brought the C-54 in the path of the Phantom and the two aircraft collided.

22 December 1969 Douglas DC-6B B-2005 suffered an explosion and hydraulic failure while descending for Nha Trang Airport. After a low level pass to check the landing gear, a nose-high flapless approach was made. The aircraft touched down, but became airborne again after application of reverse thrust. The throttles were closed and the aircraft landed again, but overran the runway, struck a concrete pylon and caught fire, killing 10 of 77 on board and 24 on the ground. A bomb placed in the front left lavatory detonated during approach, blowing a  hole in the fuselage and damaging hydraulic lines.

22 July 1970 A 20-year-old U.S. Army private, George M. Hardin, hijacked a DC-4 en route from Pleiku to Saigon. Hardin allowed the 65 passengers aboard to disembark from the plane before moving to the cockpit and threatening the pilot with a small knife. He was detained in Saigon after attempting to force the pilot, Floyd R. Derieux, to take him to Hong Kong, but the pilot told him the DC-4 could not carry enough fuel to make the trip. There were no fatalities.

30 September 1970 Douglas DC-3DST-318A B-305 crashed into a hill in the Hai Van Mountains at  near Da Nang while attempting to divert to Da Nang Airport due to weather conditions at its intended destination of Phu Bai Airport, Huế. Three of the 38 people on board were killed.

1 November 1970 Curtiss C-46 B-1543 force-landed on a beach at Quy Nhơn due to fuel system problems; the aircraft sank in sand and flooded out at high tide. The aircraft was operating on a flight from Saigon to Quang Ngai.

22 August 1971 Douglas DC-3A-375 B-304 was written off at Kampot Airport.

24 September 1972 Douglas C-54D XV-NUH crashed into a marshy area 23 miles from Saigon following a loss of control due to mechanical failure, killing 10 of 13 on board. The aircraft was operating a flight from Vientiane Airport to Tan Son Nhat International Airport.

19 March 1973 Douglas C-54D XV-NUI crashed 4.1 mi S of Buon Ma Thuot Airport following an unexplained mid-air explosion, killing all 58 on board. The aircraft was operating a flight from Tan Son Nhat International Airport to Da Nang. A bomb explosion was not ruled out.

5 September 1973 Boeing 727-121C XV-NJC suffered an explosion in the galley at  15 minutes after takeoff from Bangkok, injuring two passengers and a stewardess; the aircraft was able to return and land safely at Bangkok. Although it was thought that a bomb exploded, a Royal Thai Air Force investigation concluded that a defective broiler in the galley caused the explosion. Although the aircraft was repaired and returned to service, it was written off following the hijacking and crash of Flight 706 in 1974.

17 November 1973 Douglas C-47B XV-NIE struck a mountain at   NNW of Quảng Ngãi killing all 27 people on board. The crew, flying VFR in IMC, had gotten lost and flew too low in a mountainous area while attempting to reach Chu Lai, near the crash site. The aircraft was operating a domestic scheduled passenger flight from Tan Son Nhat International Airport to Quảng Ngãi Airport.

20 February 1974 Douglas C-54A XV-NUM was hijacked en route from Quy Nhơn to Da Nang. The hijacker was a 19-year-old South Vietnamese man demanding to go to Đồng Hới, North Vietnam. The pilot stated that the aircraft had to stop at Đông Hà to refuel, but flew to Huế instead. The hijacker realized he had been tricked and detonated explosives in the front part of the aircraft, killing three passengers and injuring several others. The explosion also blew a  hole in the port side of the fuselage and broke three starboard side windows. The aircraft was written off.

15 September 1974 Flight 706 - Le Duc Tan, a ranger in the South Vietnamese army who had recently been demoted from captain to lieutenant for the theft of two cars in Da Nang, smooth-talked his way past security checkpoints and hijacked the Boeing 727 en route from Da Nang to Saigon, demanding to go to Hanoi. The pilot explained that it was not possible and needed to stop at Phan Rang. During the approach, Tan detonated two hand grenades, and the aircraft crashed when it overshot the runway on an attempted landing. All 75 persons on board, including 67 passengers and eight crew members, were killed.

12 March 1975 Douglas C-54D XV-NUJ crashed 16 mi from Pleiku, killing all 26 on board; the wreckage was not examined due to hostile conditions in the area. The aircraft, operating a flight from Vientiane to Saigon, was probably shot down by a missile.

See also 

 Royal Air Cambodge
 Royal Air Lao

References

External links

 Timetables of Air Vietnam
 Photos of Air Vietnam
 Photos of Air Vietnam
 Photos of Air Vietnam planes

 
Defunct airlines of Vietnam
Defunct airlines of South Vietnam
Airlines established in 1951
Airlines disestablished in 1975
1951 establishments in French Indochina
1951 establishments in South Vietnam
1975 disestablishments in Vietnam
1950s in French Indochina
1950s in South Vietnam
1960s in South Vietnam
1970s in South Vietnam